Cotreumo Airport is an airstrip serving the Río Bueno commune in the Los Ríos Region of Chile.

An open-ended culvert crosses beneath the runway  from the south end, and may be a hazard for aircraft departing the centerline.

See also

Transport in Chile
List of airports in Chile

References

External links
OpenStreetMap - Cotreumo
 Bing Maps - Cotreumo
OurAirports - Cotreumo
FallingRain - Cotreumo Airport

Airports in Los Ríos Region